Tonny Roy Ayomi (born 2 August 1992) is an Indonesian professional footballer who currently plays as a midfielder for Perseru Serui in the Indonesia Super League.

References

External links
 
 Player profil at goal.com

1992 births
Living people
Indonesian footballers
Liga 1 (Indonesia) players
Perseru Serui players
Badak Lampung F.C. players
Place of birth missing (living people)
Association football midfielders